Tovil station is a closed railway station on the Medway Valley Line. The station opened in 1884 and closed in 1943.

History
In the 1900s, a branch line was constructed to serve Tovil Goods station, the only part of the Headcorn and Maidstone Junction Light Railway ever constructed. Tovil station was located just south of the junction of the branch from Tovil Goods, which faced towards Maidstone West. Tovil signal box closed in 1929. The station closed in 1943. The short branch line to Tovil Goods closed in 1977.

In 2008, it was suggested that the station should be re-opened.

References

External links
 Tovil station photograph (circa 1884)

Borough of Maidstone
Disused railway stations in Kent
Former South Eastern Railway (UK) stations
Railway stations in Great Britain opened in 1884
Railway stations in Great Britain closed in 1943